Greville Patrick Charles Howard, Baron Howard of Rising (born 22 April 1941) is a British Conservative politician and, before the 2010 general election, was variously an Opposition Whip and Shadow Minister for Cabinet Office, for Treasury and for Culture, Media and Sport.

Early life and career
He was educated at Eton College. Between 1968 and 1970, he was Private Secretary to Enoch Powell. Howard was further Director of Keep Trust from 1980 to 1987, of Fortress Trust from 1989 to 1993, and is Director of Fortress Holdings since 1993.

Political career
On 4 June 2004, he was created a life peer as Baron Howard of Rising, of Castle Rising in the County of Norfolk.

He has been a councillor on King's Lynn and West Norfolk Council from 2003.

A Westminster townhouse owned by Howard has been used at various times as a headquarters for Conservative Party political campaigns, including Michael Portillo's 1995 party leadership campaign, Boris Johnson's 2019 party leadership campaign, and most recently Liz Truss's 2022 party leadership campaign.

Family
A member of the influential Howard family, Howard is the son of Lieutenant-Colonel Henry Redvers Greville Howard (1911–1978), the son of Sir Charles Alfred Howard, the second son of the Hon. Greville Howard, who was the second son of Charles Howard, 17th Earl of Suffolk. His mother is Patience, daughter of Lieutenant-Colonel Charles Rice Iltyd Nicholl, TD (1880–1950), a solicitor, army officer and mason.

Lord Howard of Rising has married three times. Firstly he married Zoe Walker, daughter of Douglas Walker, in 1968. Divorced in 1972, he married secondly, Mary Rose Chichester, daughter of Sir John Chichester in 1978. After her death in 1980, Howard married again to Mary Cortland Culverwell, daughter of Robert Culverwell, one year later. He has 2 sons and 1 daughter by his third wife.  Lord Howard's immediate family consists of 2 sisters.  The first is his full sister, Amanda Howard.  She married Simon Burton, heir to the Burton clothing company which subsequently became part of the Arcadia group.  His half-sister Katharine currently resides in Spain.  Her son (and therefore Howard's nephew) is the son of the famous 1960s bullfighter Miguel Mateo Salcedo.

Lord Howard is a descendant of William d'Aubigny, 1st Earl of Arundel, who built Castle Rising in about 1138, and he still owns the castle remnants today.

Arms

Notes

References 
 
 

1941 births
People educated at Eton College
Greville Howard
Howard of Rising 
Living people
Councillors in Norfolk
Life peers created by Elizabeth II